Zinovios Zafirios I. Valvis (1800 – 25 August 1886) was a Greek politician and Prime Minister of Greece. Valvis was born in 1800 in Missolonghi. He first studied theology but switched to law, furthering his studies in Italy. Valvis married Arsinoe Ratzikosta and fathered nine children. He twice served as prime minister but fell on hard times in his old age, dying impoverished in 1872 after refusing a state pension so as not to be a burden on the Greek state. Zinovios Valvis was the brother of Dimitrios Valvis who also served as Prime Minister. He died in Missolonghi in 1886.

References

1800 births
1872 deaths
19th-century prime ministers of Greece
People from Missolonghi
Prime Ministers of Greece
Speakers of the Hellenic Parliament